Lennox is a city in Lincoln County, South Dakota, United States, located  southwest of Sioux Falls. The population was 2,423 at the 2020 census.

History
The city has the name of Ben Lennox, private secretary to the general manager to the Milwaukee Railroad.

Geography
Lennox is located at  (43.353769, -96.895489).

Lennox has been assigned the ZIP code 57039 and the FIPS place code 36380.

There are July 4 festivities each year, including the firecracker road race in the morning and a parade afterward.

Demographics

2010 census
As of the census of 2010, there were 2,111 people, 842 households, and 542 families living in the city. The racial makeup of the city was 98.2% White, 0.1% African American, 0.6% Native American, 0.4% Asian, and 0.6% from two or more races. Hispanic or Latino of any race were 1.1% of the population.

There were 842 households, of which 33.4% had children under the age of 18 living with them, 52.5% were married couples living together, 7.8% had a female householder with no husband present, 4.0% had a male householder with no wife present, and 35.6% were non-families. 31.6% of all households were made up of individuals, and 14.2% had someone living alone who was 65 years of age or older. The average household size was 2.41 and the average family size was 3.02.

The median age in the city was 37.8 years. 26.4% of residents were under the age of 18; 6.7% were between the ages of 18 and 24; 27.2% were from 25 to 44; 23.7% were from 45 to 64; and 16% were 65 years of age or older. The gender makeup of the city was 49.4% male and 50.6% female.

2000 census
As of the census of 2000, there were 2,037 people, 812 households, and 526 families living in the city. The population density was 1,863.8 people per square mile (721.6/km2). There were 836 housing units at an average density of 764.9 per square mile (296.1/km2). The racial makeup of the city was 98.67% White, 0.05% African American, 0.29% Native American, 0.05% Asian, 0.29% from other races, and 0.64% from two or more races. Hispanic or Latino of any race were 0.74% of the population.

There were 812 households, out of which 35.0% had children under the age of 18 living with them, 54.1% were married couples living together, 8.4% had a female householder with no husband present, and 35.2% were non-families. 31.9% of all households were made up of individuals, and 20.1% had someone living alone who was 65 years of age or older. The average household size was 2.42 and the average family size was 3.10.

In the city, the population was spread out, with 27.1% under the age of 18, 7.0% from 18 to 24, 27.9% from 25 to 44, 18.3% from 45 to 64, and 19.7% who were 65 years of age or older. The median age was 38 years. For every 100 females, there were 86.7 males. For every 100 females age 18 and over, there were 80.2 males.

As of 2000 the median income for a household in the city was $35,217, and the median income for a family was $46,848. Males had a median income of $30,758 versus $21,319 for females. The per capita income for the city was $15,940. About 2.7% of families and 3.4% of the population were below the poverty line, including 3.2% of those under age 18 and 7.4% of those age 65 or over.

Education
Lennox is a part of the Lennox School District 41-4, which operates Lennox Elementary/LWC Intermediate, and LWC Junior High School/Lennox High School.

Notable people
 Arnold Kegel, gynecologist

References

External links

Cities in South Dakota
Cities in Lincoln County, South Dakota
Sioux Falls, South Dakota metropolitan area